KEGK (106.9 FM, "The Eagle") is a classic hits radio station serving the Fargo-Moorhead area, licensed to Wahpeton, North Dakota, and primarily plays rock and pop music from the 1970s and 1980s. The station is owned by Brooke Ingstad, through licensee Radio Wahpeton Breckenridge, LLC. Its studios are located at 2720 7th Ave. South in Fargo, while its transmitter is located east of Wolverton.

History
KGWB 107.1 FM signed on as a 3,000 watt Class A radio station serving Wahpeton, North Dakota with a CHR/AC hybrid format. It continued in this format until the late 1990s, when the format was changed to oldies. In 2003, Triad Broadcasting signed a local marketing agreement with Guderian Broadcasting to operate KGWB. The station moved to studios in Fargo, and its frequency was moved to 106.9. The power was upgraded to 41,000 watts to bring a signal to Fargo-Moorhead, and the call sign was changed to KEGK with the "Eagle 106.9" moniker.

On March 18, 2008, the FCC ordered Triad to terminate its JSA to operate KEGK within 90 days.  The order was a result of a 2004 rule change that counts JSA's towards ownership cap limits.  The FCC had previously granted Triad a waiver to continue the JSA because Clear Channel was grandfathered at one extra station when the 2004 rule change occurred.  However, that situation ended when Clear Channel sold its Fargo group and one station was divested, leading the FCC to decide that Triad's waiver was no longer needed.

On April 17, 2008, it was announced that Scott Hennen's of Fargo bought KEGK. It became the sister station of 50,000 watt AM 1100 WZFG.

In the September 8, 2010 edition of the Fargo Forum, it was announced that Scott Hennen was removed as President and CEO of Great Plains Integrated Marketing, by the Board of Directors, effective 9/8/2010. Other local outlets reported that "effective immediately, he will no longer be an employee, and therefore no longer running day to day operations".

Former Logo

Program schedule
 Bo Janssen In The Morning with Jessie Aamodt (Mon-Fri 6am-9am)
 Bo Janssen (Mon-Fri 9am-10am)
 Jessie Aamodt (Mon-Fri 10am-2pm)
 Jay Farley (Mon-Fri 2pm-6pm)

Former DJs
 Emily West
 Shelly Knight
 Tim Murphy
 Mike Ray
 Nicole McCartney
 Jim Daniels 
 Diane Karol
 Kris Kraft
 Pete Serria
 Sandi Beach
 Wanda Majik
 Erik Gilmoore
 Madi Korf (Intern Daddy's Girl)
 Megan (Now at KLTA-FM)

External links
Official website
March 18, 2008 FCC order that Triad terminate JSA to operate KEGK

EGK
Oldies radio stations in the United States
Radio stations established in 1990
1990 establishments in North Dakota
Wahpeton, North Dakota